Vishamber Kahlon (born 26 November 1996) is an Indian cricketer. He made his List A debut for Goa in the 2018–19 Vijay Hazare Trophy on 2 October 2018. He made his first-class debut for Goa in the 2018–19 Ranji Trophy on 28 November 2018.

References

External links
 

1996 births
Living people
Indian cricketers
Goa cricketers
Place of birth missing (living people)